Aimable was an  Alcmène-class 26-gun frigate of the French Navy.

Career 
Aimable took part in the Battle of Rhode Island, where she helped corner HMS Cerberus and Lark and force their crew to scuttle them.  On 8 October 1781, she departed Rochefort with Iphigénie, in a division under Captain Kersaint, to take part in the Capture of Demerara and Essequibo. 

The French took Alert and Jersey into service.

Aimable took part in the Battle of the Saintes on 12 April 1782. On 19 April, ships from Hood's squadron captured her during the Battle of the Mona Passage. The British recommissioned her as HMS Aimable.

Bergère was carrying Victor Hugues as a passenger. The French vessels had with them the East Indiaman , which they had captured the same morning; René Lemarant de Kerdaniel was captain of the prize crew on Calcutta. Glenmore recaptured Calcutta while Aimable engaged Sirène and Bergère. A 35-minute action ensued before the two French vessels departed. Sirène had as prisoners Captain Haggy, Calcuttas master, her first and second mates, and 50 of her lascars and seamen. Calcutta arrived in Plymouth on 12 January 1800. On 18 January 50 lascars were landed from Calcutta and taken to China House, which served as a hospital. The lascars were sick and suffering from the cold.

Citations and references 
Citations

References
 
  (1671-1870)
 

Frigates of the French Navy
Frigates of the Royal Navy
1776 ships
Ships built in France
Captured ships